The 2018 West Florida Argonauts football team will represent the University of West Florida in the 2018 NCAA Division II football season. They will be led by third-year head coach Pete Shinnick. The Argonauts will play their home games at Blue Wahoos Stadium and are members of the Gulf South Conference.

Schedule
West Florida 2018 football schedule consists of five home and six away games in the regular season. The Argonauts will host GSC foes Florida Tech, Shorter, Valdosta State, and West Georgia, and will travel to Delta State, Mississippi College, North Greenville, and West Alabama.

The Argonauts will host one of the three non-conference games against Carson–Newman from the South Atlantic Conference (SAC) and  will travel to  Midwestern State from the Lone Star Conference and North Alabama, which is a FCS Independent team.

Two of the eleven games will be broadcast on ESPN3, as part of the Gulf South Conference Game of the Week.

Schedule Source:

Rankings

Game summaries

Carson-Newman

at Midwestern State

Shorter

at Mississippi College

at Delta State

at North Alabama

West Georgia

Florida Tech

at North Greenville

Valdosta State

at West Alabama

References

West Florida
West Florida Argonauts football seasons
West Florida Argonauts football